Muhammad Nur Adam Bin Abdullah (born 13 April 2001) is a Singaporean professional footballer who plays as a left-back or centre-back for Singapore Premier League club Lion City Sailors and the Singapore national team. He was nominated for the Dollah Salleh award in 2016 but didn't win the award. He was nominated again in 2018  and won the award. Nur Adam Abdullah begins training stint with UEFA Europa League club after winning the 2018 Dollah Salleh award.

International career 
Nur Adam received his first senior national team call-up in a training session in March 2021.

On 11 November 2021, Nur Adam made his international debut for the Singapore national team in a friendly match against Kyrgyzstan. On 18 December 2021, Nur Adam made his competitive debut at the 2020 AFF Championship with a 0–2 loss against Thailand.

Career statistics

Club

International

International caps

U23 International caps

U23 International goals

U19 International caps

Honours

Club 
Lion City Sailors

 Singapore Premier League: 2021

References

Living people
2001 births
Singaporean footballers
Nigerian footballers
Association football midfielders
Singapore Premier League players
Young Lions FC players
Competitors at the 2021 Southeast Asian Games
Southeast Asian Games competitors for Singapore